{{Infobox company |
  name   = Société Générale (SG)|
  logo   = Société_Générale.svg|
  type   = Public|
  traded_as      = |
  company_slogan = |
  foundation     = 1975|
  location       =  Ring Road Central, Accra, Greater Accra, Ghana|
  key_people     = Kofi AmpimChairmanSionle YeoManaging DirectorArnaud CrouzetChief Operating Officer|
  num_employees  = |
  assets         = US$ 554+ million (GHS 1,088+ million) (2012)|
  revenue        =  Aftertax: US$ 15.4 million (GHS 30.3 million) (2012)|
  industry       = Financial services|
  products       = Loans, Checking, Savings, Investments, Debit Cards, Credit Cards|
    homepage       = 
}}

Societe Generale Ghana Limited (SG) is a bank that is based in Ghana, previously known as Société Générale - Social Security Bank'' (SG-SSB). The bank is part of the Société Générale banking group.  The bank is based in Accra and its stock is listed on the Ghana Stock Exchange.  It is a component of the GSE All-Share Index.  According to its website it is the 7th largest bank in Ghana and has 45 networked branches in Ghana.

History
SG began in 1975 as "Security Guarantee Trust Limited" and the next year changed its name to "Social Security Bank Limited", or "SSB". In 1994, SSB and the "National Savings and Credit Bank" merged under a World Bank program.  The next year, the government of Ghana divested its 21% share of the bank and it was converted to a public limited liability company and subsequently listed on the Ghana Stock Exchange. In 2004, the bank rebranded as SG-SSB after Societe Generale acquired a 51% controlling interest in the institution. and in 2013 rebranded as SG to conform with the group name Société Générale.

Overview
According to its website, the bank is the 5th largest commercial bank in Ghana by assets, as of December 2011. , the bank's total assets were valued at approximately US$423.4 million (GHS:685.9 million), with shareholders' equity of approximately US$71.9 million (GHS:116.2+ million). The bank markets the "Sika" program including the SIKA Card, a credit card and the Sikatext Initiative Program.  The bank is actively investing in internet banking.

Société Générale Group
The bank is one of the Société Générale subsidiaries. Out of these, seventeen (17) are in Africa, in the countries of: Algeria, Benin, Burkina Faso, Cameroon, Chad, Côte d’Ivoire, Egypt, Ghana, Guinea, Equatorial Guinea, Madagascar, Mauritania, Morocco, Senegal, South African Republic, and Tunisia.

Ownership
The bank's stock is listed on the Ghana Stock Exchange and is traded under the symbol: SG-SSB'''. Major shareholders in the bank include the following corporate entities and individuals:

Branches
, SG-SSB maintains a network of thirty-eight branches in all regions of Ghana.

Greater Accra region

Accra New Town (Branch)
Ashaiman ( Branch)
Faanofa (Branch)
Kasoa (Branch)
Kaneshie Main (Branch)  
Spintex Road (Branch)   
Osu (Branch)
East Legon (Branch) 
Lotteries (Agency)  
Pig Farm Spot Bank (Agency)  
North Industrial Area (Branch) 
Accra Main (Branch) 
Okaishie (Branch)  
Premier Towers (Branch)  
Ring Road Central (Branch)   
Tema Main Comm 2 (Branch)  
Tema Fishing Harbour (Branch)   
Tema Motorway Spot Bank (Agency) 
Tudu (Branch)   
Madina (Branch)
Dansoman )(BRANCH)
 Achimota (BRANCH)

Ashanti region

Adum (Branch)  
Asafo (Branch)  
Kumasi Central (Branch) 
Suame (Branch)  
Tepa (Agency) 
Kejetia (Branch)

Brong-Aharfo region

Berekum (Branch)
Sunyani (Branch)

Central region

Cape Coast (Branch)
Dunkwa (Branch)

Eastern region

Akim Oda (Branch)
Koforidua (Branch)

Northern region

Tamale (Branch)

Upper east region

Bolgatanga (Branch)

Volta region

Ho (Branch)

Western region

Adabokrom (Agency)
Bibiani (Branch)
Takoradi (Branch)
Akontombra (Agency)

Tarkwa (Branch)

See also
 List of banks in Ghana
 Economy of Ghana

References

External links
SG-SSB Homepage
Research on SG-SSB from Gold Coast Securities in Ghana, in PDF format
Profile at Alacrastore
The 20 Major Shareholders In SG-SSB

Banks of Ghana
Companies listed on the Ghana Stock Exchange
Banks established in 1975
Société Générale
1975 establishments in Ghana